Rebsamen is a surname. Notable people with the surname include:

François Rebsamen (born 1951), French politician
Paul Rebsamen (1905–1947), American football player
Rahel Rebsamen (born 1994), Swiss bobsledder